Bobrovnya is a rural locality (a village) in Dubrovsky District, Bryansk Oblast, Russia. The population was 6 as of 2010. There is 1 street.

Geography 
Bobrovnya is located 32 km south of Dubrovka (the district's administrative centre) by road. Ruchey is the nearest rural locality.

References 

Rural localities in Dubrovsky District